In Greek mythology, the name Chthonia (Ancient Greek: Χθωνία means 'of the earth') may refer to:

Chthonia, an Athenian princess and the youngest daughter of King Erechtheus and Praxithea, daughter of Phrasimus and Diogeneia. She was sacrificed by her father who had received a prophecy according to which he could win the imminent battle against Eumolpus only if he sacrificed his daughter. Her sisters who had sworn to kill themselves if one of them died, fulfilled their oath by throwing themselves off a cliff. According to the dictionary Suda, only two of the sisters, Protogeneia and Pandora, did commit suicide which made sense, since of the other daughters of Erechtheus, Orithyia had been abducted by Boreas, Procris married off to Cephalus, and Creusa was still a baby at the time the oath had been sworn. It was also said, however, that Chthonia married her uncle Butes, which probably indicated a version that she was not sacrificed. Her other siblings were Cecrops, Pandorus and Metion, and possibly Merope, Orneus, Thespius, Eupalamus and Sicyon.
Chthonia, daughter of Phoroneus or of Colontas. She and her brother Clymenus were said to have founded a sanctuary of Demeter Chthonia (see below) at Hermione. In another version, Demeter, during her wanderings in search of Persephone, was ill-treated by Colontas, against which Chthonia protested. Demeter burned Colontas alive in his house, but saved Chthonia and transported her to Hermione, where she founded the aforementioned sanctuary.
Chthonia or  Phthonia (Phosthonia) one of the Alcyonides, daughters of the giant Alcyoneus. She was the sister of Alkippe, Anthe, Asteria, Drimo, Methone and Pallene. When their father Alcyoneus was slain by Heracles, these girls threw themselves into the sea from Kanastraion, which is the peak of Pellene. They were then transformed into halcyons (kingfishers) by the goddess Amphitrite.
Chthonia, an epithet of Demeter and several other chthonic deities, such as Hecate, Nyx or Melinoe.

Chthonia was also an ancient mythical and poetical name of Crete.

Notes

References 

 Apollodorus, The Library with an English Translation by Sir James George Frazer, F.B.A., F.R.S. in 2 Volumes, Cambridge, MA, Harvard University Press; London, William Heinemann Ltd. 1921. . Online version at the Perseus Digital Library. Greek text available from the same website.
Apollonius Rhodius, Argonautica translated by Robert Cooper Seaton (1853-1915), R. C. Loeb Classical Library Volume 001. London, William Heinemann Ltd, 1912. Online version at the Topos Text Project.
 Apollonius Rhodius, Argonautica. George W. Mooney. London. Longmans, Green. 1912. Greek text available at the Perseus Digital Library.
 Diodorus Siculus, The Library of History translated by Charles Henry Oldfather. Twelve volumes. Loeb Classical Library. Cambridge, Massachusetts: Harvard University Press; London: William Heinemann, Ltd. 1989. Vol. 3. Books 4.59–8. Online version at Bill Thayer's Web Site
 Diodorus Siculus, Bibliotheca Historica. Vol 1-2. Immanel Bekker. Ludwig Dindorf. Friedrich Vogel. in aedibus B. G. Teubneri. Leipzig. 1888–1890. Greek text available at the Perseus Digital Library.
Euripides, The Complete Greek Drama, edited by Whitney J. Oates and Eugene O'Neill, Jr. in two volumes. 1. Ion, translated by Robert Potter. New York. Random House. 1938. Online version at the Perseus Digital Library.
 Euripides, Euripidis Fabulae. vol. 2. Gilbert Murray. Oxford. Clarendon Press, Oxford. 1913. Greek text available at the Perseus Digital Library.
 Gaius Julius Hyginus, Fabulae from The Myths of Hyginus translated and edited by Mary Grant. University of Kansas Publications in Humanistic Studies. Online version at the Topos Text Project.
 The Hymns of Orpheus. Translated by Taylor, Thomas (1792). University of Pennsylvania Press, 1999. Online version at the theoi.com
Lucius Mestrius Plutarchus, Lives with an English Translation by Bernadotte Perrin. Cambridge, MA. Harvard University Press. London. William Heinemann Ltd. 1914. 1. Online version at the Perseus Digital Library. Greek text available from the same website.
Pausanias, Description of Greece with an English Translation by W.H.S. Jones, Litt.D., and H.A. Ormerod, M.A., in 4 Volumes. Cambridge, MA, Harvard University Press; London, William Heinemann Ltd. 1918. . Online version at the Perseus Digital Library
 Pausanias, Graeciae Descriptio. 3 vols. Leipzig, Teubner. 1903.  Greek text available at the Perseus Digital Library.
 Stephanus of Byzantium, Stephani Byzantii Ethnicorum quae supersunt, edited by August Meineike (1790-1870), published 1849. A few entries from this important ancient handbook of place names have been translated by Brady Kiesling. Online version at the Topos The Hymns of Orpheus. Translated by Taylor, Thomas (1792). University of Pennsylvania Press, 1999. Online version at the theoi.comText Project.
 Suida, Suda Encyclopedia translated by Ross Scaife, David Whitehead, William Hutton, Catharine Roth, Jennifer Ben
 edict, Gregory Hays, Malcolm Heath Sean M. Redmond, Nicholas Fincher, Patrick Rourke, Elizabeth Vandiver, Raphael Finkel, Frederick Williams, Carl Widstrand, Robert Dyer, Joseph L. Rife, Oliver Phillips and many others. Online version at the Topos Text Project.

Princesses in Greek mythology
Mythological Thracian women
Deeds of Demeter
Attican characters in Greek mythology
Greek mythology of Thrace
Epithets of Demeter
Epithets of Hecate
ru:Хтония